Larry Florman, known as Brother Love is an American musician.

He is perhaps the first artist to receive truly large-scale recognition through his involvement in podsafe music. His music was popularized to a large audience of podcast listeners when his song Push was featured on the Daily Source Code, and received airtime through many more podcasts via the Podsafe Music Network.

His rise to the top of the PMC Top10, a podsafe music chart, further propelled him into podcast fame. His song Summertime spent eleven weeks in the countdown including an unprecedented six weeks at the No. 1 spot. His follow-up song, There She Goes was No. 1 for three weeks.

Brother Love currently works closely with the Keith and The Girl podcast, making many guest appearances commencing September 2006 till present, as well as touring with KATG on their live audience shows.

His first major commercial was Saturn Cars during Memorial Day Weekend 2007, and a Reese's Puff cereal commercial.

Brother Love played drums for NYC-based southern rock band, Her and King's County for a few years. After leaving this band, he and guitarist Alex Haddad sought out to make straight forward honest rock with their new band Them Vibes.

Discography
Album of the Year (2004, independent)
Turn It Up! (2007, independent)
Shine On (2013, independent)

References

External links
Official website
Them Vibes official website

Living people
Place of birth missing (living people)
Singers from New York City
Year of birth missing (living people)
Singer-songwriters from New York (state)